Krishnamurthy Perumal (born 26 September 1943) is a two-time Olympic medalist in field hockey and Arjuna Award winning sportsman for India. He hails from the city of Chennai, Tamil Nadu. En route to the Indian national hockey team, he played for teams such as the ICF (Integrated Coach Factory), Tamil Nadu and Indian Airlines. He has served Indian and Tamil Nadu hockey with distinction in various roles – as a player, manager and coach. He served as the president of Tamil Nadu Hockey Association. For his dedication and excellence in his sport, he was honored with what was then, India's highest accolade for a sportsman – the Arjuna Award – in 1971.

References
 1971 Arjuna Award – Ministry of Youth and Sports – India
 Sports Development Authority of Tamilnadu
 Government of Tamilnadu – Reference to Mr P. Krishnamurthy as Olympian and Arjuna Award Winner

External links
 

1943 births
Living people
Field hockey players from Chennai
Olympic bronze medalists for India
Olympic field hockey players of India
Recipients of the Arjuna Award
Tamil sportspeople
Field hockey players at the 1968 Summer Olympics
Field hockey players at the 1972 Summer Olympics
Indian male field hockey players
Asian Games medalists in field hockey
Field hockey players at the 1970 Asian Games
Medalists at the 1972 Summer Olympics
Medalists at the 1968 Summer Olympics
Asian Games silver medalists for India
Medalists at the 1970 Asian Games
Olympic medalists in field hockey